The Gibson L-7C is an archtop acoustic guitar and one of the few archtop guitars still in production from major makers without an electric pickup.

Gibson first introduced the L-7C in the late 1940s.

External links
 Gibson.com: Gibson L-7C website

L7C